Geyperman was the name of a Spanish action figure manufactured by the company Geyper during the 1970s.

Geyper, although a Hasbro licensee, used Palitoy's product line as the basis for their outfits. The figure itself was a combination of various Hasbro molds, using talker style torsos (screwed together, rather than a single mold). The first version had the head of the first G.I. Joe figures with flocked hair, beard and no beard, and was available from 1976 to 1979. Later, the Eagle-Eye head mold with fixed eyes was released in Spain only. This was the transitional model and was available from 1978 to 1980, with flocked hair and no beard, and the colour of the skin is lighter than the model of second wave 1980-1982, which was darker and came with both beard and no beard, and a body that didn't have the inscriptions Geyper (made in Spain), which the previous models had.

Packaging
There are a few examples of Geyperman packages; one can see from the Radio BackPack comparison that even the logo was inspired directly by Palitoy's "Action Man". They also included a "star" scheme similar to Action Man, for mail-in equipment/figure offers.

Closed box
In most cases, closed box packages included a photo of the item in use, but some like the radio, used painted artwork to display the item.

Window box
This type of packaging is very close to that used by both Palitoy and Hasbro, for Action Man and G.I. Joe respectively. The graphics were usually original Hasbro artwork, modified in some instances. This type of packaging was ideal in terms of the child seeing exactly what he would receive.

Uniform box artwork
The outfit box artwork was almost identical to that of Palitoy's line. The following are uniform set graphics, attached to the left side of the box. The box itself was the same format as the sabotage set; black frame, with yellow carding & blister pack to retain items. The back of the box illustrated the range of outfits and accessories offered for sale by Geyper.

Small outfit sets
Geyper also offered outfits in a smaller package, with the items enclosed in a plastic bag inside a closed box. The Cowboy and "Indian" (Native American) sets are examples of this type. The back of the packages have photo illustrations of the other; Cowboy shows native American, and vice versa.

Accessory cards
Geyper offered budget carded accessory packs containing just a few items to augment one's collection at a reasonable price for children to afford themselves. The back of the card illustrated other items or outfits offered by Geyper.

Related history
In 1964, Hasbro toy company's first "action figure" was introduced with the name of G.I. Joe. They were 12" tall and represented the four branches of the military: Army, Navy, Air Force & Marines. The toyline was dedicated to one character named G.I. Joe and later on, the line featured vehicles, accessories, talking soldiers and six foreign soldiers.

The original 12-inch G.I. Joe was licensed to several countries:
 to the Spanish company Geyper appearing as Geyperman in the 70s
 to the UK company Palitoy, appearing as Action Man in the 60s
 in Germany as Action Team in the 70s
 in France as Group Action Joe 1976-81
 in Brazil as Falcon from Estrella in the 70s (and again in the 90s)
 in Japan as "GIJOE" and "Combat Man"  from Takara (Hasbro Licensee) in the 60s
 also in Japan from Tsukuda (Palitoy sub-licensee)

The nineties Action Man was released by Hasbro International for the European market in uniform packaging, no longer licensed to individual companies.

See also
 Airgamboys
 Action Man
 G.I. Joe

References
 DePriest, D. (1999) "The Collectable G.I. Joe"
()

External links
 Geyperman - official web site.
 La guía gráfica de Geyperman - site devoted to Geyper Man figures (in Spanish).
 ActionManHQ - Action Man information page.

Action figures
Playscale figures
es:Geyperman